Scary Godmother: The Revenge of Jimmy is a 2005 computer-animated comedy film and the sequel to Scary Godmother: Halloween Spooktakular (2003). It is based on Jill Thompson's second book in her Scary Godmother series, also named The Revenge of Jimmy. Britt McKillip, Tabitha St. Germain, Brittney Irvin, Garry Chalk, and Scott McNeil reprise their roles, while Alexander Ludwig, Richard Warke, Dexter Bell, and Nathan Tipple replace voice actors of characters from the first special, with Ludwig as Jimmy instead of Alex Doduk.

Plot 
Many Halloweens ago, Hannah's cousin, Jimmy, loved dressing up like a monster until last Halloween when he discovered that monsters are real and fears they will get him again this year; he plans to end Halloween to protect himself, while his friends, Daryl, Bert, and Katie, decide to go trick-or-treating with Hannah while distancing themselves from Jimmy due to his monster paranoia.

On the Fright Side, the Scary Godmother and her assortment of friends (Harry, Mr. Skully Pettibone, Bug-A-Boo, the vampire family of Max, Ruby, and Orson) are planning another annual Halloween party; however, the Fright Side is being affected by Jimmy's actions to end the holiday, such as smashing pumpkins in the pumpkin patch, sneaking into stores to contaminate candy and make costumes flammable, and vandalizing the abandoned spook house Hannah met the Godmother last time with toilet paper, and as this is happening he is slowly turning into an actual devil such as growing pointed ears, a unibrow, a scrunched-up nose, a wide grin and sharp teeth. Hannah successfully gets around these hurdles by making the smashed pumpkin holes serve as mouth, making new treats not involving candy, and imagining the toilet paper on the house as a set of ghost, putting the Fright Side universe back together and stable. Hannah takes Daryl, Bert and Katie to the house, introducing them to the friendly monsters and having them be taken to the party on the Fright Side.

Jimmy has one more plan to spoil the holiday, by stealing the party's Best Costume prize. He is initially successful, stealing the prize while all the guests are dancing. However, Jimmy bursts out loud the pumpkin consists of candy, which is noticed by a food-addicted Harry; a fight between the werewolf and Jimmy ensues, before Bug-A-Boo arrives and scares Jimmy, while Jimmy also makes Bug-A-Boo scream. After Jimmy's fright, Bug-a-Boo explains that he looked really scary, so Scary Godmother announces that Jimmy has won the contest. Jimmy is back to his old self again, and the party continues.

Production 
Scary Godmother: The Revenge of Jimmy is based on the second book in Jill Thompson's Scary Godmother series of the same name, which was released in 1998. It was produced in three months by a team of 14 animators using the same keyframe technique as the original special. Five actors from the original special reprise their roles in The Revenge of Jimmy: Tabitha St. Germain as the titular Scary Godmother and Countess Ruby, Britt McKillip as Hannah Marie, Scott McNeil as Mr. Skully Pettibone and Count Max, Garry Chalk as Harry and Bug-A-Boo, and Brittney Irvine as Katie. Four characters had their voice actors replaced, one of them being Jimmy, who was initially voiced by Alex Doduk but in the sequel was performed by an early-career Alexander Ludwig, who later gained mainstream recognition after starring in The Hunger Games (2012). Orson is voiced by Richard Warke replacing Adam Pospisil, Bert is voiced by Dexter Bell taking over Danny McKinnon, and Daryl by Nathan Tipple replacing Noel Callahan.

Release and reception 
Scary Godmother: The Revenge of Jimmy was released by Anchor Bay Entertainment to DVD on August 29, 2005, with bonus features such as deleted scenes, storyboards, and interview segments such as a Fright Side Chat. It premiered on Cartoon Network on October 7, at 7:30 PM, and re-aired on the network that month five times (at a later time on October 7, 10, 18, 30, and 31). Halloween Spooktakular also had five airings on the network that month. Like its predecessor, The Revenge of Jimmy became an annual tradition to run on the network during the Halloween season. In Canada, it aired three times on YTV on October 25, 29, and 30 the same year. The special was nominated for Best Animated Production by the Canadian Awards for the Electronic and Animated Arts. It and Halloween Spooktakular were included on Lionsgate's 2014 Kids Halloween 4-Pack that also featured two episodes from other cartoon series ("Eloise's Rawther Unusual Halloween" and "Wubbzy Goes Boo!"). Both Scary Godmother specials became available on the Canadian streaming service Crave in October 2020.

References

External links
 

2005 television films
2005 films
2005 computer-animated films
Halloween television specials
2005 television specials
Rainmaker Studios films
Films about Halloween
Films based on American comics
Animated films based on comics
Animated films based on children's books
Canadian sequel films
American animated television films
Canadian animated television films
2000s American films
2000s Canadian films